Jamie S. Gorelick (born May 6, 1950) is an American lawyer who served as the Deputy Attorney General of the United States from 1994 to 1997, during the Clinton administration. She has been a partner at WilmerHale since 2003 and has served on the board of directors of Amazon since February 2012.

Gorelick served on British Petroleum's Advisory Council, as their top legal counsel after the 2010 Deepwater Horizon oil spill. She was appointed by former Senate Democratic Leader Tom Daschle to serve as a commissioner on the bipartisan National Commission on Terrorist Attacks Upon the United States, which sought to investigate the circumstances leading up to the terrorist attacks of September 11, 2001 and also served as Vice Chairman of Fannie Mae.

Early life 
Gorelick was born in Brooklyn, New York City to Leonard and Shirley Gorelick, and grew up in Great Neck, New York, in a Jewish family. She attended Great Neck South High School, graduating in 1968. She went on to receive a J.D. cum laude from Harvard Law School in 1975.

Gorelick was president of the District of Columbia Bar from 1992 to 1993.

She is a law partner in the Washington office of WilmerHale and a member of the boards of Amazon.com, United Technologies Corporation, the John D. and Catherine T. MacArthur Foundation, the Carnegie Endowment for International Peace, the Washington Legal Clinic for the Homeless and Legal Affairs.

Deputy Attorney General 

While serving as Deputy Attorney General under Bill Clinton, Gorelick spoke in favor of banning the use of strong encryption and called for a key escrow system to allow the Federal government access to encrypted communication.

Private  practice 
Gorelick is a lobbyist for the lending industry fighting student loan reform. Gorelick has also represented Cardinal Health.

Federal National Mortgage Association (Fannie Mae)
Gorelick was appointed Vice Chairman of Federal National Mortgage Association (Fannie Mae) from 1997 to 2003. She served alongside former Clinton Administration official Franklin Raines. During that period, Fannie Mae developed a $10 billion accounting scandal.

On March 25, 2002, Business Week interviewed Gorelick about the health of Fannie Mae. Gorelick is quoted as saying, "We believe we are managed safely. We are very pleased that Moody's gave us an A-minus in the area of bank financial strength – without a reference to the government in any way. Fannie Mae is among the handful of top-quality institutions." One year later, government regulators accused Fannie Mae of improper accounting "to the tune of $9 billion" in unrecorded losses.

In an additional scandal concerning falsified financial transactions that helped the company meet earnings targets for 1998, a "manipulation" that triggered multimillion-dollar bonuses for top executives, Gorelick received $779,625.

A 2006 report of an investigation by the Office of Federal Housing Enterprise Oversight into Fannie Mae's accounting practices and corporate governance revealed that from 1998 to 2002 Gorelick received a total of $26.5 million in income from Fannie Mae.

9/11 Commission
According to Gorelick's op-ed letter in the Washington Post she states that: "At last week's hearing, Attorney General John Ashcroft, facing criticism, asserted that 'the single greatest structural cause for September 11 was the wall that segregated criminal investigators and intelligence agents' and that I built that wall through a March 1995 memo." However, the report from the 9/11 Commission, co-authored by Gorelick, asserts that the 'wall' limiting the ability of federal agencies to cooperate had existed since the 1980s and is in fact not one singular wall but a series of restrictions created over the course of over twenty years.

Conflict of interest
A 1995 Department of Justice memorandum states that the procedures her memorandum put in place for the investigation of the 1993 WTC bombing "go beyond what is legally required...[to] prevent any risk of creating an unwarranted appearance that FISA is being used to avoid procedural safeguards which would apply in a criminal investigation." The wall intentionally exceeded the requirements of FISA (the Foreign Intelligence Surveillance Act of 1978) for the purposes of criminal investigations, as well as the then-existing federal case law. These rules were, shortly after their creation, expanded to regulate such communications in future counter-terrorism investigations.

Gorelick eventually recused herself from reviewing her own role in the regulation of information about terrorist activities. Attorney General Ashcroft was incensed before the 9/11 commission to learn that the commission had not investigated or been told of Gorelick's memo or her role regarding the "wall". This assertion was disputed by former senator Slade Gorton (R-WA), a member of the 9/11 Commission, who said, "nothing Jamie Gorelick wrote had the slightest impact on the Department of Defense or its willingness or ability to share intelligence information with other intelligence agencies." Gorton also asserted that "the wall" was a long-standing policy that had resulted from the Church committee in the 1970s, and that the policy only prohibits transfer of certain information from prosecutors to the intelligence services and never prohibited information flowing in the opposite direction.

Testifying before the commission, Attorney General John Ashcroft said, "Although you understand the debilitating impact of the wall, I cannot imagine that the commission knew about this memorandum, so I have declassified it for you and the public to review," he said. "Full disclosure compels me to inform you that its author is a member of this commission."

Lawyer for Duke University 
Gorelick was added in February 2008 to Duke University's defense team after the 2006 Duke University lacrosse case scandal. The University faced claims by unaccused members of the team that they "railroaded 47 Duke University students as either principals or accomplices." Gorelick and her law firm left the defense team in July 2011 after Judge Beatty denied Duke's motions to dismiss and let the lawsuits proceed in April.

Lawyer for Jared Kushner 
Gorelick represented Jared Kushner, the son-in-law of Donald Trump, as he considered a possible role in the White House. She had advised Kushner, who has sprawling financial interests in a multibillion-dollar global real estate empire, on how he might comply with federal ethics and anti-nepotism laws. She has argued that although officials leading federal agencies are barred from hiring relatives, the White House is not an agency and thus exempt. Gorelick  argued that if Kushner forgoes  a White House salary, he would not be bound by federal nepotism rules. Though Kushner has no experience  in government or public policy, Trump directed that during his presidential transition all foreign-policy matters be relayed through Kushner. Kushner  participated in meetings between Trump and foreign heads of state while continuing to run the Kushner Companies. On July 14, 2017, Gorelick stepped away from the lead role in the Russian investigation and turned over all responsibilities to Abbe Lowell. Gorelick will still work on other matters for Kushner that she was originally retained for. In September 2017 she briefly fell for fake emails originating from "email prankster" James Linton purporting to be from Kushner but didn't reveal anything confidential.

Charitable work and community involvement
Gorelick has served on the boards of the John D. and Catherine T. MacArthur Foundation, the Urban Institute, the Washington Legal Clinic for the Homeless and the Carnegie Endowment for International Peace. She was elected to The American Law Institute in 1987.

Personal
She is married to Richard Edward Waldhorn, a pulmonologist, and has two children.

References

External links

Gorelick official biography from the National Commission on Terrorist Attacks Upon the United States
Gorelick's Wall, Opinion Journal (Wall Street Journal 4/15/04) This link is no longer valid. I clicked the link, and it points instead to a page of several unrelated WSJ articles as of September 30, 2022.

1950 births
Living people
American people of Russian-Jewish descent
Amazon (company) people
Clinton administration personnel
Harvard Law School alumni
Lawyers from Brooklyn
Lawyers who have represented the United States government
Jewish American attorneys
People from Great Neck, New York
Radcliffe College alumni
United States Deputy Attorneys General
William A. Shine Great Neck South High School alumni
Wilmer Cutler Pickering Hale and Dorr partners
Urban Institute people